Leslie Gordon Clark (30 December 1903 – 26 September 1974) was a New Zealand cricket umpire. He stood in two Test matches in 1956. He also played two first-class matches for Otago. He is the father of cricketer Leslie Clark who played for Otago and Auckland.

Clark was born at Christchurch in 1903 and educated at Lyttleton District High School. He worked as a labourer and died at Wellington in 1974. Following his death an obituary was published in the New Zealand Cricket Annual.

See also
 List of Test cricket umpires
 West Indian cricket team in New Zealand in 1955–56

References

1903 births
1974 deaths
Sportspeople from Christchurch
New Zealand Test cricket umpires
New Zealand cricketers
Otago cricketers